Jaspal Inder Singh Kalra, better known as Jiggs Kalra (21 May 1947 – 4 June 2019), was an Indian restaurateur, food columnist, television host, and author. He was popularly known as the "czar of Indian cuisine" and "tastemaker to the Nation."

Career
Jaspal Inder Singh Kalra attended Mayo College, a boarding school in Rajasthan, where he was captain of the basketball team where he may have acquired the nickname Jiggs. Soon after graduating, he started working as a trainee journalist at The Times of India in Bombay.

Kalra wrote about innovative restaurants, unusual ingredients and new and old techniques in Indian cuisine.
With his encyclopedic knowledge of North Indian cuisine, he was often the last word on authenticity; he was frequently sought out by restaurants and hotels to perfect recipes and develop menus.
He authored over 11 titles on Indian cuisine, including PRASHAD which is also considered as 'the bible' for chefs of today.
He was considered an ambassador of Indian cuisine worldwide.

In 2013, he opened a new restaurant, Masala Library, in Bandra, which the New York Times called "his temple of new-age Indian cuisine."

He was a recipient of the Lifetime Achievement Award from the Mayo College Heritage Society.
He had been an advisor to the India Trade Promotion Organisation,
advisor to the Ministry of Tourism, Government of Rajasthan and on the Board of
Directors of MTR Foods.
He represented India at the Peabody Hotel (Memphis in May festival, USA 1999),
the First World Gourmet Summit in Singapore,
the St Moritz Winter Festival in Switzerland,
and the Third Food and Wine Festival in Singapore.

He anchored two television programs, Zaike Ka Safar and Daawat: An Invitation to Indian Cooking.
Per the New York Times, "his efforts in particular to chronicle and promote Awadhi cuisine is said to have changed Indian restaurant menus across the world."
He was inducted into the International Food and Beverage Forum Hall of Fame (2004) for his personal commitment and exceptional contribution to the international aspects of the F&B industry.

His place and contribution in authentic Indian cuisine is second to none.

His book PRASHAD is considered by chefs all over the world as the bible of Indian cooking.

Television
Daawat, one of India's first food shows, aired on Doordarshan in 1991 hosted by Jiggs Kalra. Each of the 32 episodes featured unique recipes made by a cook brought in by Kalra.

He also hosted Zaike ka Safar, a food-centric travelogue on Zee.

Publications
Books authored by Jiggs Kalra include:

 1986 - Prashad: Cooking with Indian Masters. .
 2001 - Jiggs Kalra's Daawat: The Television Series with Pushpesh Pant. .
 2003 - Kama Bhog: Foods of Love. .
 2004 - Classic Cooking of Punjab. .
 2005 - Jiggs Kalra`s Classic Cooking Of Avadh. .
 2007 - Zaike Ka Safar: 100 Best of Jiggs Kalra. .
 2016 - Classic Cooking of Rajasthan. .

References 

1947 births
2019 deaths
Indian restaurateurs
Indian food writers